Javier Francisco Pérez Larrinaga (February 3, 1902 – death unknown), nicknamed "Blue", was a Cuban infielder in the Negro leagues during the 1930s and 1940s.

A native of San Antonio de los Baños, Cuba, Pérez made his Negro leagues debut in 1933 with the Bacharach Giants. He went on to play for the Brooklyn Eagles and Homestead Grays, and finished his career with a four-year stint with the New York Cubans from 1942 to 1945. In 1943, he was part of a rare triple play executed by New York against the Birmingham Black Barons at Rickwood Park.

References

External links
 and Baseball-Reference Black Baseball stats and Seamheads

1902 births
Year of death missing
Place of death missing
Bacharach Giants players
Brooklyn Eagles players
Homestead Grays players
New York Cubans players
Baseball infielders